Tischeria bifurcata is a moth of the family Tischeriidae. It is known in the United States from Arizona and California.

The larvae feed on Ceanothus arboreus. They mine the leaves of their host plant.

References

Tischeriidae
Moths described in 1915